Jonjo Heuerman  BEM  (born 2 January 2002) is an English charity fundraiser.

Inspired to start charity fundraising following the death of his grandmother in 2009 from bowel cancer, by 2015 Heuerman, from Dartford, Kent had raised £235,000 for the Bobby Moore cancer fund. Aged 13 he was the youngest recipient of an award in the 2016 New Year Honours list when he was awarded the British Empire Medal.

Fund raising achievements

In 2014 Heuerman, an avid football fan and supporter of West Ham United, dribbled a football for 50 miles from Roots Hall the ground of Southend United to the Boleyn Ground, the home of West Ham.
In 2015 he cycled  to visit all of the Premier League football clubs in England returning to London for a  walk between the Premier League clubs in London. His efforts were rewarded by British Prime minister, David Cameron who awarded Heuerman Britain's 230th Points of Light award.

External links
Heuerman's page at Just Giving

References

Living people
Recipients of the British Empire Medal
Charity fundraisers (people)
People from Dartford
2002 births